Edith Spurlock Sampson (October 13, 1901 – October 8, 1979) was an American lawyer and judge, and the first Black U.S. delegate appointed to the United Nations on 24 August 1950. She conceded that Black people did not have equal rights in America but she said "I would rather be a Negro in America than a citizen in any other land."

Youth and education
Sampson was one of eight children and was born in a black family in Pittsburgh, Pennsylvania, U.S. to Louis Spurlock and Elizabeth A. McGruder. She left school at 14 due to family financial difficulties and found work cleaning and deboning fish at a market. She later returned to school and graduated from Peabody High School in Pittsburgh. She then went to work for Associated Charities and studied at the New York School of Social Work. After she received the highest grade in a criminology course, George Kirchwey of Columbia, one of her instructors, encouraged her to become an attorney.

She married Rufus Sampson and they moved to Chicago where while working full-time during the day as a social worker she studied law at night. Sampson graduated from John Marshall Law School in 1925 winning a special dean's commendation for ranking at the top of her jurisprudence class.

Legal work
In 1924, Sampson opened a law office on the South Side of Chicago, serving the local black community. From 1925 through 1942, she was associated with the Juvenile Court of Cook County and served as a probation officer. In 1927 Sampson became the first woman to earn a Master of Laws from Loyola University's Graduate Law School. She also passed the Illinois bar exam that year. In 1934 Sampson was admitted to practice before the Supreme Court. In 1943, she became one of the first black members of the National Association of Women Lawyers. In 1947 she was appointed an Assistant State's Attorney in Cook County.

International politics
In 1949, Sampson was part of the Round-the-World Town Meeting which was a program that sent twenty-six prominent Americans on a world tour meeting leaders of foreign countries and participating in public political debates and radio broadcasts.  In these meetings, Sampson sought to counter the propaganda in the Soviet Union during the Cold War regarding the treatment of African Americans in the United States.  During one meeting in India, she said:

She also stated that "I would rather be a Negro in America than a citizen in any other land."  Supreme Court Justice William O. Douglas said that her actions "created more good will and understanding in India than any other single act by any American". Sampson was generally praised by US media. However, coverage of Sampson's comments provoked the Baltimore Afro-American to remark: "With all of the talk about democracy abroad, we hope that in the not too distant future, examples of democracy at home will be more commonplace and, consequently, attract less attention".

Sampson also attacked Soviet communism directly by comparing it to slavery and accusing, in particular, the Soviet Union of enslaving prisoners of war from World War II. In a report circulated by the American government, Sampson reportedly told Soviet Ambassador Yakov Malik: "We Negroes aren't interested in Communism... We were slaves too long for that. Nobody is happy with second-class citizenship, but our best chances are in the framework of American democracy."

United Nations

As a result of the Town Meeting tour and her other public speaking, President Truman appointed Sampson as an alternate U.S. delegate to the United Nations on 24 August 1950, making her the first African-American to officially represent the United States at the UN.  She was a member of the UN's Social, Humanitarian, and Cultural Committee, where she lobbied for continued support of work in social welfare.  She also presented a resolution pressuring the Soviet Union to repatriate the remainder of its Prisoners of War from World War II.  She was reappointed to the UN in 1952, and served until 1953.  During the Eisenhower Administration, she was a member of the U.S. Commission for UNESCO. In 1961 and 1962, she became the first black U.S. representative to NATO.

Dissent
Sampson began to express great dissent from American policies in 1959–1960. In a speech to African American high school graduates, she said "We have convinced ourselves, because it seemed so necessary, that the battle against injustice could be won piece by piece through changes in law, through court appeals, through persistent but cautious pressures. We were mistaken. No–we were wrong. Ours was not the only way. It was not even the best way.

Judgeship
In 1962, Sampson ran for associate judge of the Municipal Court of Chicago, and easily won the election; she was the first black woman to be elected as a judge in the state of Illinois.  In 1966, she became an associate judge for the Circuit Court of Cook County.  Most of the cases that she heard were housing disputes involving poor tenants, in which she was perceived as "an understanding but tough grandmother".

By 1969 she had apparently regained her faith in working within the system, saying in a speech: "We learned that we could work within the establishment, the system, without necessarily knuckling under to it."

She continued as a Circuit Court judge until she retired in 1978. She died in Chicago in October 1979.

Family
Sampson first married Rufus Sampson, a field agent for the Tuskegee Institute. They divorced, but she retained the name Edith Sampson as she was already professionally known by it. In 1935, she married lawyer Joseph E. Clayton, with whom she shared her legal practice until his death in 1957. Two of her nephews, Charles T. Spurlock and Oliver Spurlock, were also judges. Her niece, Jeanne Spurlock, became the first African American woman to be dean of an American medical school (Meharry Medical College). Sampson's great-niece, Lynne Moody, is an actress who appeared in the television miniseries Roots. Sampson became an honorary member of Zeta Phi Beta sorority in 1952.

See also
List of African-American jurists
List of first women lawyers and judges in Illinois

References

Further reading

External links

 Edith Sampson Papers. Schlesinger Library, Radcliffe Institute, Harvard University.

Illinois lawyers
Illinois state court judges
Loyola University Chicago School of Law alumni
Lawyers from Chicago
Politicians from Pittsburgh
1901 births
1979 deaths
Probation and parole officers
African-American judges
Illinois Democrats
Columbia University School of Social Work alumni
African-American diplomats
American diplomats
American women diplomats
John Marshall Law School (Chicago) alumni
20th-century American judges
20th-century American women judges
20th-century American lawyers
20th-century African-American women
20th-century African-American people